Illiparambil Corah Chacko (1875–1966) was a geologist, philologist, writer and grammarian of Kerala, India.

He was born in Pulinkunnu in Kuttanad in Alappuzha, Kerala. After graduation from Maharajas College in Ernakulam, he went to London, and studied Physics in the Imperial College of Science and Technology, University of London. He became an Associate of the Royal School of Mines. He was the State Geologist of Travancore State and the Director of Industries.

He was also a writer in English, Malayalam and Sanskrit. He was the second recipient of the Kenthra Sahitya Academy Award (instituted in 1955), which he was conferred in 1956 for his work 'Paananeeya Pradyoditham'. The Academy also has an Endowment Award in his name.

References

External links

1875 births
1966 deaths
Writers from Kottayam
University of Madras alumni
Alumni of Imperial College London
20th-century Indian geologists
Malayalam-language writers
Sanskrit writers
Sanskrit grammarians
Indian Indologists
Recipients of the Sahitya Akademi Award in Malayalam
Indian male writers
Indian philologists
Maharaja's College, Ernakulam alumni
People from Alappuzha district
Scholars from Kerala
20th-century Indian linguists
Writers in British India